Westside Consolidated School District #5 is a public school district headquartered in unincorporated Craighead County, Arkansas, near Jonesboro.

The district encompasses  of land, and serves several rural communities in the Craighead and Lawrence counties. It principally serves Bono, Cash, and Egypt, and it also serves portions of Jonesboro. Of the three main communities, as of 2003 Bono is the largest.

All schools and the district are accredited by the Arkansas Department of Education (ADE) and AdvancED.

History
The school district opened in 1966, a consolidation of the Bono, Cash, and Egypt School districts.

In 1975, the Westside High School obtained accreditation from AdvancED (formerly North Central Association).

In 1994, the Westside Elementary School obtained accreditation from AdvancED.

In 1997, the Westside Middle School obtained accreditation from AdvancED.

In 1998, the Westside Middle School massacre occurred.  there was a perception that the schools were unsafe due to the attack.

James Dunivan served as superintendent beginning in 2000, and served as such until 2004, when he took that job at the Nettleton School District. James P. Best, previously the superintendent of the Heber Springs School District, replaced Dunivan.

Schools
The district's schools include:
 Westside Elementary School, serving more than 650 students in prekindergarten through grade 4 (PK–4).
 Westside Middle School, serving more than 350 students in grades 5 through 7.
 Westside High School, serving more than 550 students in grades 8 through 12.

Previously the district had a separate Westside Junior High School.

References

Further reading
  (Download) - Includes boundaries of predecessor school districts: Cash, Bono, and Egypt

External links

 
 

School districts in Arkansas
Education in Craighead County, Arkansas
Education in Lawrence County, Arkansas
Jonesboro metropolitan area
School districts established in 1966
1966 establishments in Arkansas
Jonesboro, Arkansas